The  was a Japanese cargo ship from the Seia Maru-class, which was sunk in military service by ML-KNIL Brewsters during World War II. It was part of the 11th Air Fleet.

History 
Construction was ordered on 17 June 1939 by Kokusai Kisen K.K.. During construction, the ship was taken over by Osaka Shosen Kaisha. It was built by Harima Zosensho K.K. and was laid down and named Nana Maru on 16 April 1940. On 29 June, construction was finished and the ship started service between Japan and South Africa. Because of the war, the Japanese Imperial Navy requisitioned the ship on 21 September 1941 so that it could be used as a transport ship.

Sinking 
Brewster pilots 1st Lt. P.A. Hoyer and Sgt. A.E. Stoové of the 2-VLG-V squadron dropped their bombs upon the ship's deck. At 17:30 the captain ordered abandon ship, and at 21:00, after a large explosion, the Nana Maru sank to the bottom of the ocean.

References 

Ships built in Japan
World War II merchant ships of Japan
Cargo ships sunk by aircraft
1940 ships
Shipwrecks in the Makassar Strait
World War II shipwrecks in the Pacific Ocean
Maritime incidents in January 1942